The 2000 Australian Open was a tennis tournament played on outdoor hard courts at Melbourne Park in Melbourne in Australia. It was the 88th edition of the Australian Open and was held from 17 through 30 January 2000.

Both Yevgeny Kafelnikov and Martina Hingis were unsuccessful in their title defences, both being defeated in the final matches by Andre Agassi and Lindsay Davenport, respectively. For Agassi, it was the second of four Australian Open titles, and for Davenport it was her final Grand Slam title.

Former champions
The following are the former Grand Slam champions and finalists in the draw:
 Andre Agassi ('95 Australian, '99 French, '92 Wimbledon, '94 and '99 US Open)
 Michael Chang ('89 French)
 Jim Courier ('91-'92 French, '92-'93 Australian)
 Yevgeny Kafelnikov ('99 Australian, '96 French)
 Richard Krajicek ('96 Wimbledon)
 Gustavo Kuerten ('97 French)
 Pete Sampras ('94 and '97 Australian, '93-'95 and '97-'99 Wimbledon, '90 & '93 & '95-'96 US Open)

The following are former Grand Slam finalists in the draw:
 Alberto Berasategui ('94 French)
 Àlex Corretja ('98 French)
 Thomas Enqvist ('99 Australian)
 Goran Ivanišević ('92 & '94 & '98 Wimbledon)
 Todd Martin ('94 Australian, '99 US Open)
 Andrei Medvedev ('99 French)
 Mark Philippoussis ('98 US Open)
 Cédric Pioline ('93 US Open, '97 Wimbledon)

Seniors

Men's singles

 Andre Agassi defeated  Yevgeny Kafelnikov, 3–6, 6–3, 6–2, 6–4
It was Agassi's 1st title of the year, and his 45th overall. It was his 6th career Grand Slam title, and his 2nd Australian Open title.

Women's singles

 Lindsay Davenport defeated  Martina Hingis, 6–1, 7–5
It was Davenport's 1st title of the year, and her 27th overall. It was her 3rd (and last) career Grand Slam title, and her 1st Australian Open title.

Men's doubles

 Ellis Ferreira /  Rick Leach defeated  Wayne Black /  Andrew Kratzmann, 6–4, 3–6, 6–3, 3–6, 18–16

Women's doubles

 Lisa Raymond /  Rennae Stubbs defeated  Martina Hingis /  Mary Pierce, 6–4, 5–7, 6–4

Mixed doubles

 Rennae Stubbs /  Jared Palmer defeated  Arantxa Sánchez Vicario /  Todd Woodbridge, 7–5, 7–6(7–3)

Juniors

Boys' singles
 Andy Roddick defeated  Mario Ančić, 7–6(7–2), 6–3

Girls' singles
 Anikó Kapros defeated  María José Martínez Sánchez, 6–2, 3–6, 6–2

Boys' doubles
 Nicolas Mahut /  Tommy Robredo defeated  Tres Davis /  Andy Roddick, 6–2, 5–7, 11–9

Girls' doubles
 Anikó Kapros /  Christina Wheeler defeated  Lauren Barnikow /  Erin Burdette, 6–3, 6–4

Seeds

Men's singles
  Andre Agassi (champion)
  Yevgeny Kafelnikov (final, lost to Andre Agassi)
  Pete Sampras (semifinals, lost to Andre Agassi)
  Nicolas Kiefer (quarterfinals, lost to Magnus Norman)
  Gustavo Kuerten (first round, lost to Albert Portas)
  Thomas Enqvist (first round, lost to Richard Fromberg)
  Nicolás Lapentti (second round, lost to Arnaud Clément)
  Todd Martin (second round, lost to Fernando Vicente)
  Richard Krajicek (second round, lost to Nicolas Escudé)
  Tommy Haas (second round, lost to Younes El Aynaoui)
  Tim Henman (fourth round, lost to Chris Woodruff)
  Magnus Norman (semifinals, lost to Yevgeny Kafelnikov)
  Cédric Pioline (first round, lost to Goran Ivanišević)
  Karol Kučera (first round, lost to Paradorn Srichaphan)
  Albert Costa (first round, lost to Christophe Rochus)
  Mark Philippoussis (fourth round, lost to Andre Agassi)

Women's singles
  Martina Hingis (final, lost to Lindsay Davenport)
  Lindsay Davenport (champion)
  Serena Williams (fourth round, lost to Elena Likhovtseva)
  Mary Pierce (fourth round, lost to Ai Sugiyama)
  Nathalie Tauziat (second round, lost to Sonya Jeyaseelan)
  Barbara Schett (fourth round, lost to Arantxa Sánchez)
  Amélie Mauresmo (second round, lost to Patty Schnyder)
  Amanda Coetzer (second round, lost to Kristina Brandi)
  Julie Halard-Decugis (quarterfinals, lost to Lindsay Davenport)
  Conchita Martínez (semifinals, lost to Martina Hingis)
  Anna Kournikova (fourth round, lost to Lindsay Davenport)
  Sandrine Testud (fourth round, lost to Martina Hingis)
  Arantxa Sánchez Vicario (quarterfinals, lost to Martina Hingis)
  Dominique Van Roost (second round, lost to Jennifer Capriati)
  Anke Huber (first round, lost to Kristie Boogert)
  Elena Likhovtseva (quarterfinals, lost to Conchita Martínez)

Withdrawals: Marcelo Ríos, Greg Rusedski, Patrick Rafter, Venus Williams, Monica Seles

Prize money

Total prize money for the event was $1000

References

 
 

 
2000 in Australian tennis
January 2000 sports events in Australia
2000,Australian Open